Anastassios "Tassos" Sagos  (-‡2002 to 2005) served as the International Commissioner of the Scouts of Greece.

In 1993, Sagos was awarded the 229th Bronze Wolf, the only distinction of the World Organization of the Scout Movement, awarded by the World Scout Committee for exceptional services to world Scouting.

References

External links

complete list

Source: https://web.archive.org/web/20120219003355/http://www.scout.org/en/content/download/6314/59099/file/TR_2002-2005_7_EN.pdf

Recipients of the Bronze Wolf Award
Year of birth missing
Year of death missing
Scouting and Guiding in Greece